Here's Loretta Singing "Wings Upon Your Horns" is the fifteenth solo studio album by American country music singer-songwriter Loretta Lynn. It was released on January 5, 1970, by Decca Records.

Critical reception

The review published in the January 24, 1970 issue of Billboard said, "Loretta Lynn socks it to you with "Wings Upon Your Horns" and "You Wouldn't Know an Angel (If You Saw One)". Toil and jilted love are the main themes of nearly all the songs on this LP. She wrote or helped write seven of the tunes. Also good are "I'm Dynamite", "When I Reach the Bottom (You'd Better Be There)" and "This Big Ole Hurt"."

Cashbox published a review in the January 17 issue which said, "Teeing off with her recent mash, "Wings Upon Your Homs", Loretta Lynn offers an album that has, as all of her albums do, everything going for it. From the opening notes to the last strains, the set is up to the artist’s perennially high standards and should do as well, if not better, for her, as her previous LP ventures. Save a special spot on your shelves for this one."

Commercial performance 
The album peaked at No. 5 on the US Billboard Hot Country LP's chart and at No. 146 on the US Billboard Top LP's chart.

The album's only single, "Wings Upon Your Horns", was released in October 1969 and peaked at No. 11 on the US Billboard Hot Country Singles chart.

Recording
Recording sessions for the album took place on October 1, 2, and 3, 1969, at Bradley's Barn in Mount Juliet, Tennessee. Five of the album's tracks were from previous recording sessions. "Big Ole Hurt" was recorded during the January 18, 1967 session for 1967's Singin' with Feelin'. "This Stranger (My Little Girl)" and "I Only See the Things I Want to See" were recorded during sessions for 1969's Your Squaw Is on the Warpath on August 30 and November 19, 1968, respectively. "When I Reach the Bottom (You'd Better Be There)" and "You Wouldn't Know an Angel (If You Saw One)" were recorded during sessions for 1969's Woman of the World/To Make a Man on April 2 and May 14, 1969, respectively.

Track listing

Personnel
Adapted from the album liner notes and Decca recording session records.
Harold Bradley – electric bass guitar
Owen Bradley – producer
Larry Butler – piano
Floyd Cramer – piano
Ray Edenton – guitar, acoustic guitar
Buddy Harman – drums
Junior Huskey – bass
The Jordanaires – background vocals
Loretta Lynn – lead vocals
Grady Martin – guitar, lead electric guitar
Bob Moore – bass
Norbert Putnam – bass
Hargus Robbins – piano
Hal Rugg – steel guitar
Jerry Shook – guitar
Pete Wade – guitar
Teddy Wilburn – background vocals
James Wilkerson – vibes
Joe Zinkan – bass

Charts 
Album

Singles

References 

1970 albums
Loretta Lynn albums
Albums produced by Owen Bradley
Decca Records albums